Termitopaedia is a genus of Aleocharinae in the tribe Termitopaediini.

References

Aleocharinae genera
Aleocharinae